Ted W. Watts (born May 29, 1958) is a former American football player.

Football career
He was the cornerback of the Oakland/Los Angeles Raiders, New York Giants, and the San Diego Chargers. Watts played six years in the NFL. Collegiately, he played for the Texas Tech Red Raiders.

References

1958 births
Living people
American football cornerbacks
Oakland Raiders players
Los Angeles Raiders players
New York Giants players
San Diego Chargers players
Texas Tech Red Raiders football players
Coffeyville Red Ravens football players